Teshwan Castro (born 29 February 1992) is a Trinidadian cricketer. He played in one first-class match for Trinidad and Tobago in 2012.

See also
 List of Trinidadian representative cricketers

References

External links
 

1992 births
Living people
Trinidad and Tobago cricketers